Thomas Jefferson Cram (March 1, 1804 – December 20, 1883) was an American topographical engineer from New Hampshire who served in the United States Army Corps of Topographical Engineers from 1839 to 1863 and the United States Army Corps of Engineers from 1863 to 1869.

He served as General Superintendent for harbor works on Lake Michigan and the construction of roads in Wisconsin Territory. He led surveys to determine the border of Michigan and Wisconsin Territory in the Upper Peninsula, to explore Oregon and Washington Territories, and to determine the feasibility of a water route to the Pacific through Central America.  He served under General Zachary Taylor in the Army of Occupation during the Mexican American War and conducted coastal and river surveys in Texas.

He participated in the United States Lake Survey and led the survey section between Green Bay, Wisconsin and Chicago, Illinois.  He conducted multiple river, canal and harbor improvement assessments including for the Fox and Wisconsin River in Wisconsin, the Ohio River in Louisville, Kentucky and the St. Louis, Missouri harbor on the Mississippi River.  He assisted the United States Coast Survey in New England from 1847 to 1855 and in North Carolina from 1858 to 1861.

During the American Civil War, he was promoted to Lieutenant Colonel and Colonel and served as aide-de-camp to General John E. Wool.

Biography
Cram was born in Acworth, New Hampshire. He graduated from the U.S. Military Academy in 1826 and taught mathematics and natural and experimental philosophy at the Academy from 1829 to 1836. He was commissioned a 2nd Lieutenant in the 4th U.S. Artillery.  In 1835 he was promoted to 1st Lieutenant and resigned his commission in 1836.

He worked as an assistant engineer for the railroad industry in Maryland and Pennsylvania for two years and returned to Army service as a captain in 1838. In 1839, he was assigned as the General Superintendent for harbor works in Lake Michigan and road construction in Wisconsin Territory with Howard Stansbury and Lorenzo Sitgreaves assigned to assist him. He made improvements to the harbors of Chicago, St. Joseph and Michigan City and built new harbors at Kenosha, Calumet, Milwaukee and Racine.  Cram built seven roads in Wisconsin and used timber truss bridges designed by Stephen Long for all spans greater than 20 feet long.

As part of the settlement of the Toledo War, between Michigan and Ohio, most of the Upper Peninsula of Michigan was granted to Michigan. The U.S. Congress created the Wisconsin Territory in 1836 and appropriated funds to conduct a survey to determine the boundary between Wisconsin and Michigan.  In 1840, Cram and Douglass Houghton led the boundary survey team up the Menominee River to its source at Brule Lake. A previous map incorrectly listed Lac Vieux Desert as the headwater of the Menominee River and the Montreal River.  He negotiated a treaty with the Ojibwa Chief Ca-sha-o-sha which allowed the survey to continue.  The survey could not be completed in 1840 due to errors in the map used by Congress to determine the boundary. Cram returned to the Upper Peninsula in 1841 to continue the survey. He identified Lac Vieux Desert as the source of the Wisconsin River and recommended a different boundary between Wisconsin and Michigan. Congress used the border recommended by Cram when they passed the Wisconsin Enabling Act of 1846 prior to Wisconsin becoming a state in 1848. Michigan refuted the results of the survey and claimed that Cram's interpretation of the boundary cheated Michigan out of 800 square miles of land. The case reached the U.S. Supreme Court in 1926 and was decided in favor of Wisconsin.

In 1841, Cram participated in the United States Lake Survey.  His portion of the survey began at Green Bay and moved south toward Chicago while William G. Williams began his portion at Green Bay and moved north toward Mackinac Island.

In 1843, Cram conducted work in Louisville, Kentucky to improve navigation of the falls on the Ohio River.  Cram recommended the expansion of the canal and construction of a second canal to provide two way river traffic, however the recommendations were not approved by Congress and were not implemented.

In 1844, Cram was assigned to improve the harbor works at St. Louis, Missouri.  The harbor required improvements since the flow of the Mississippi River had formed sandbars that trapped ships or required long diversions to avoid them.  He proposed several works to remedy the situation but they were deemed too experimental and expensive.  The construction of a dam was selected and work began on it until the outbreak of the Mexican American War.

In 1845, Cram served as chief topographical engineer in the Army of Occupation under General Zachary Taylor during the Mexican American War.  He conducted systematic topographic surveys of the Nueces River, the Laguna de la Madre and Aransas Bay.  He fell ill with dysentery and was replaced by George Meade.

From 1847 to 1855, he worked as an assistant to the U.S. National Geodetic Survey of the Coast and had responsibility for the New England region.

From 1855 to 1858 he was the chief topographical engineer for the Department of the Pacific.  He led survey teams on expeditions through the Oregon and Washington Territories and worked to determine the feasibility of a water route to the Pacific through Central America.

In 1861, Cram was promoted to major in August and then lieutenant colonel in September. He served as aide to General John E. Wool from 1861 to 1863 and was engaged in the campaign to capture Norfolk, Virginia, in May 1862. Lt. Col. Cram was transferred to the Army Corps of Engineers when the Topographical Engineers were disbanded in 1863, and was promoted to full colonel at the end of the war in 1865. He was later brevetted to Major General to recognize his war service, and served until his retirement in 1869.

Cram died in Philadelphia, Pennsylvania and was interred at Laurel Hill Cemetery.

Bibliography
Basin of the Mississippi, and its Natural Business Site, Briefly Considered., New York: Narine & Co., 1851
Address of Captain T.J. Cram, U.S. Corps of Topographical Engineers, Delivered at the Board of Trade Rooms, June 28 and Repeated Before the Corn Exchange Association, of Philadelphia, July 11, 1860, Upon Ocean Steam Ships Proposed to Run Between Philadelphia and Europe, and California, In the Lines of a Corporation Titled the "California, Philadelphia, and European Steamship Company.", Philadelphia: Jackson Printer, 1860
Memoir Upon the Northern Inter-Oceanic Route of Commercial Transit, Between Tide Water of the Puget Sound of the Pacific, and, Tide Water of the St. Lawrence Gulf of the Atlantic Ocean., Detroit: Board of Trade, 1868

Citations

Sources
 Beers, Henry P., "A History of the U.S. Topographical Engineers, 1813-1863." 2 parts, The Military Engineer 34 (Jun 1942): pp. 287–91 & (Jul 1942): pp. 348–52. Available as of April 16, 2006 from https://web.archive.org/web/20140926122419/http://topogs.org/History.htm and https://web.archive.org/web/20110728120914/http://www.topogs.org/History2.htm

External links
Manitowish Waters Historical Society - Thomas Jefferson Cram Maps 1838-1841
Report of the Secretary of War, communicating, in compliance with a resolution of the Senate of the 5th instant, a copy of the report of Captain Thomas J. Cram, Corps of Topographical Engineers of November, 1856, on the oceanic routes to California
Topographical memoir and report of Captain T.J. Cram, on Territories of Oregon and Washington
University of Wisconsin Milwaukee - American Geographical Society Library Digital Map Collection - Thomas J. Cram Maps

1804 births
1883 deaths
American explorers of the Pacific
American military personnel of the Mexican–American War
American topographers
Burials at Laurel Hill Cemetery (Philadelphia)
Explorers of Central America
Explorers of Oregon
Explorers of Texas
Explorers of Washington (state)
People from Acworth, New Hampshire
People of New Hampshire in the American Civil War
People of pre-statehood Wisconsin
Union Army colonels
United States Army Corps of Engineers personnel
United States Army Corps of Topographical Engineers
United States Coast Survey personnel
United States Military Academy alumni
Upper Peninsula of Michigan